Blake Andre Bellefeuille (born December 27, 1977) is an American former professional ice hockey center who played in five National Hockey League (NHL) games over parts of two seasons ( and ) with the Columbus Blue Jackets, recording one assist. As a youth, he played in the 1991 Quebec International Pee-Wee Hockey Tournament with the Boston Bruins minor ice hockey team.

Career statistics

Regular season and playoffs

International

Awards and honors

References

External links
 

1977 births
American men's ice hockey centers
Boston College Eagles men's ice hockey players
Bridgeport Sound Tigers players
Charlotte Checkers (1993–2010) players
Columbus Blue Jackets players
Danbury Trashers players
Hartford Wolf Pack players
Living people
Norfolk Admirals players
Sportspeople from Framingham, Massachusetts
Philadelphia Phantoms players
Providence Bruins players
Syracuse Crunch players
Undrafted National Hockey League players
Ice hockey players from Massachusetts